The Bischler–Möhlau indole synthesis, also often referred to as "The Bischler Indole Synthesis," is a chemical reaction that forms a 2-aryl-indole from an α-bromo-acetophenone and excess aniline; it is named after August Bischler and 
.

Despite its long history, this classical reaction had received relatively little attention in comparison with other methods for indole synthesis, owing to the reactions harsh conditions, poor yields and unpredictable regioselectivity. Recently, milder methods have been developed, including the use of lithium bromide as a catalyst and an improved procedure involving the use of microwave irradiation.

History 
What is now known as the Bischler-Möhlau Indole Synthesis was discovered and formulated through the separate, but complimentary, findings of German Scientist Richard Möhlau in 1882 and Russia-born German chemist August Bischler (with partner H. Brion) in 1892. These two researchers did not collaborate with each other, but instead independently developed very similar procedures starting from an aromatic ketone structure with an excess of some aniline and ultimately producing a product. The images below depict the original indole synthesis equations written by Möhlau and Bischler, respectively: 

Being that both scientists had published their works for Indole Synthesis within the same decade, the general indole synthesis process was given the name "Bischler-Möhlau Indole Synthesis."

This original procedure for the indole synthesis is known to have inconsistent results and yields, but has been modified into new "Indole Synthesis" procedures:

 Buu-Hoï Modified Indole Synthesis
 Blackhall and Thomson Modified Indole Synthesis
 Japp and Murray Modified Indole Synthesis

Reaction mechanism 
The first two step involve the reaction of the α-bromo-acetophenone with molecules of aniline to form intermediate 4. The charged aniline forms a decent enough leaving group for an electrophilic cyclization to form intermediate 5, which quickly aromatizes and tautomerizes to give the desired indole 7.

See also
Fischer indole synthesis
Bischler–Napieralski reaction

References

Indole forming reactions
Name reactions